Memphis Theological Seminary is an ecumenical seminary of the Cumberland Presbyterian Church in Memphis, Tennessee. Although it is affiliated with the Cumberland Presbyterian Church, it accepts and trains ministerial candidates from other denominations as well. Besides the traditional Master of Divinity (MDiv), Memphis Theological Seminary also grants the Master of Arts in Christian Ministry (MACM) with concentrations in Social Justice, Christian Education, and Chaplaincy, as well as the Doctor of Ministry (DMin). It also administers the Cumberland Presbyterian denomination's Program of Alternate Studies or PAS.

MTS is a continuation of the Cumberland Presbyterian Theological School. It was moved from the campus of Bethel College (now Bethel University) in McKenzie, Tennessee, to Memphis in 1964.

The president is Rev. Dr. Jody Hill. The seminary is accredited by the Association of Theological Schools in the United States and Canada (ATS) and the Commission on Colleges and Schools of the Southern Association of Colleges and Schools (SACS). The seminary is also approved by the University Senate of the United Methodist Church to educate United Methodist theological students.

The seminary is located in Midtown Memphis at the corner of Union Avenue and East Parkway, across town from the denominational Cumberland Presbyterian Center in Cordova, Tennessee.

Notable alumni
E. A. Carmean

References

External links
Official website

 
Presbyterian universities and colleges in the United States
Educational institutions established in 1908
Presbyterianism in Tennessee
Seminaries and theological colleges in Tennessee
Universities and colleges accredited by the Southern Association of Colleges and Schools
Universities and colleges in Memphis, Tennessee
1908 establishments in Tennessee